Françoise Mallison (born in Lyon, 1940) is a French Indologist specialising in the history and religious traditions of Gujarat. She was the Head of Studies at the École pratique des hautes études, Sorbonne.

Life and career
Françoise Mallison was born in Lyon, France in 1940. She read Medieval studies at the École Nationale des Chartes from 1960. After she submitted her thesis, she worked as a curator at the French National Archives between 1964–67, and again between 1969–71.

Mallison also studied the Hindi language at the École nationale des langues orientales vivantes from 1962. Supervised by Charlotte Vaudeville, she defended her dissertation Satî-Gîtâ, le chant de la femme fidèle, traduction de la version gujarati (Sati-Gita: the song of the faithful woman; translated from the Gujarati) in 1969. She was then attached to the École française d'Extrême-Orient (EFEO)'s Pune branch, which she headed between 1971–77.

Returning to France, she lectured at the École pratique des hautes études, and then supervised a research programme on the history and philology of Western India in the Middle Ages at the EFEO. She retired from the EFEO in October 1994.

Religious studies
Mallison's area of research is pre-modern and medieval Gujarati literature. She has rediscovered and analyzed texts from the last thousand years, ranging from hymns such as the Prabhatiyam to the Ginans of the Ismailis, and local interpretations of Sanskrit epics such as the Ramayana.

In her researches into religious sects of Gujarat, she has shown that some hymns (such as the Sant Vani) transcended religious boundaries. She proposed that a Naklamki (the tenth avatar of Vishnu, also known as Kalki) cult in Saurashtra started by Ismaili Khojas in the nineteenth century, using Hindu terms such as avatar and borrowing classical Hindu stories, became a Hindu cult. Another example of transcultural diffusion of religious texts that Mallison uncovered was the Delami Aradh. Between the 13th and 15th centuries, this ritual began with Ismailis and then was adopted by Gujarati Mahamargis, a Tantric sect. The Mahamargis themselves, she showed, was an ecumenical cult but chiefly run by an untouchable caste, the Meghvals.

Mallison investigated the spread of the bhakti teachings of Vallabha, a fifteenth century itinerant saint. She claimed that his doctrines, based on Krishna-worship – already well-established in Gujarat – were especially popular among the merchant bania caste, because he taught that the pursuit of material gain was compatible with bhakti. This was countered by the argument that the Bhagavad Gita already confirmed the consonance between one's faith and one's varna-related calling.

A major religious movement Mallison studied was that of Swaminarayan. She showed that origin stories of its founder Sahajanand Swami, a yogi, resemble those of the Hindu deity Krishna; he is depicted in garb resembling that of the god, and one of the nicknames of Krishna, Ranachhoda, under which he is worshipped at Dwarka was also given to the yogi. These allow the followers of the movement to identify Sahajanand with Krishna.

Cultural traditions
Mallison explored the spread of vernacular culture in Gujarat via dhol songs. These were popular depictions of folklore that were at one time widespread, but later came to be associated with the Vallabha sect.

Mallison reconstructed the history of the Braj Language School in Bhuj, Gujarat, a cultural institution that educated poets and professional writers from 1749–1948. She was able to collect and publish a narrative of the school from widely dispersed technical literature and poetry from the school.

Selected works

References 

1940 births
20th-century French historians
21st-century French historians
French Indologists
French scholars of Islam
Hindu studies scholars
Living people